was the governor of Okayama Prefecture in Japan from November 1996 until November 2012. A native of Okayama, Okayama and graduate of the University of Tokyo, he had worked at the Ministry of Construction since 1969 before being elected governor. Ishii is affiliated to the revisionist lobby Nippon Kaigi.

References 

 

1945 births
Living people
People from Okayama
University of Tokyo alumni
Members of Nippon Kaigi
Governors of Okayama Prefecture